The Rio Pardinho e Rio Vermelho Environmental Protection Area is an environmental protection area in the state of São Paulo, Brazil.

Location

The Rio Pardinho e Rio Vermelho Environmental Protection Area (APA) is in the municipality of Barra do Turvo, São Paulo.
It is in the Atlantic Forest biome, originally covered by dense rainforest.

History

The Rio Pardinho e Rio Vermelho Environmental Protection Area  was created by state law 12.810 of 21 February 2008.
This law broke up the old Jacupiranga State Park and created the Jacupiranga Mosaic with 14 conservation units.
The APA is administered by the São Paulo Forestry Foundation (Fundação para Conservação e a Produção Florestal do Estado de São Paulo).

Notes

Sources

Environmental protection areas of Brazil
Protected areas established in 2008
Protected areas of São Paulo (state)
2008 establishments in Brazil